Kostel Božího těla (local dialect: kosteléček, literally Corpus Christi Church or The Church of Holy Body) is a pilgrimage Roman Catholic church built in Baroque style. The structure is situated in woods between Bludov and Hrabenov villages in the Olomouc Region of the Czech Republic. The area is administrated by Bludov council. The place is firstly noticed in a list of 1533. Old church was replaced by a new structure in 1724 and this structure was extensively renovated in 1835.

The legend about the foundation

Peasant woman stole a sacramental bread in church in Šumperk. She wanted to add the bread to a cattle fodder to improve milk production. She was killed by wild bees on the way to Bludov village. Bees moved the bread to a tree cavity and made the wax monstrance. People were so impressed by this miracle they decided to build new church in its place.

Šumperk District
Buildings and structures in the Olomouc Region
Roman Catholic churches completed in 1724
18th-century Roman Catholic church buildings in the Czech Republic